Beginning in the 1950s, The Walt Disney Company began producing made-for-television films in their long-running anthology series Disneyland (later to be popularly known as The Wonderful World of Color and The Wonderful World of Disney).  Many of Disney's TV movies were miniseries that aired in installments over several weeks, and a few (such as Davy Crockett and The Scarecrow of Romney Marsh) were later re-edited and released theatrically.  During the 1980s, in addition to films made for their weekly TV series, Disney began making original films for their television network, The Disney Channel.  After the acquisition of ABC in the 1990s, Disney began co-producing uncharacteristic films (Stephen King's Storm of the Century, Home Alone 4) as well as TV reunion movies (The Facts of Life Reunion, The Growing Pains Movie) and a few in conjunction with Hallmark Entertainment (Dinotopia, Mr. St. Nick, Snow White: The Fairest of Them All).

1950s

1960s

1970s

1980s

1990s

2000s

2010s

2020s

See also
 List of Disney theatrical animated features
 List of Disney feature-length home entertainment releases
 List of television films produced for Disney Channel
 List of Disney film soundtracks
 List of Disney television series
 Lists of Walt Disney Studios films
 Timeline of The Walt Disney Company
 Disney Channel Original Series

References

External links
 Disney Channel Original Movies official website
 UltimateDisney.com – Full List of Disney Channel Original Movies and DVD Statuses

Disney Made For TV
Television films
Lists of American films